The Institute for Transport Studies (ITS) is a school within the Environment Faculty of the University of Leeds in the UK. The institute is one of the leading centres for teaching and research in transport in the United Kingdom, and attracts a number of students from outside the UK for its Masters and PhD programmes.

The Institute 
The University of Leeds first offered a Transport Planning & Engineering Masters programme in 1965, and this evolved by 1972 into a fully fledged Institute within the university.

The institute is based on University Road, within the main University of Leeds campus, housing approximately 90 academic/research staff. ITS received royal recognition in 2009 by winning a prestigious  Queen's Anniversary Prize for Higher and Further Education - the prize was awarded for "sustained excellence - 40 years' impact in transport research and teaching."

Teaching 

Teaching at ITS focuses on three levels, with perhaps the best known of these being the postgraduate programmes, which attract students from around the world.

Undergraduate
Undergraduate programmes are offered in conjunction with other departments of the University of Leeds, such as Geography and Civil Engineering. A range of ITS elective modules are available for students from any discipline and staff of the Institute regularly teach on undergraduate modules hosted in other Faculties. www.its.leeds.ac.uk/courses/undergraduate

Masters
ITS offers Masters programmes, available as 1 year of full-time study, or 2–3 years part-time study:

 MSc (Eng) Transport Planning and Engineering
 MSc Sustainability in Transport 
 MSc Transport Economics
 MSc Transport Planning
 MSc Transport Planning and the Environment
These are considered amongst the best available in the world, and attract students from around the world including from a number of European, Asian, America, and African countries.

Graduate Employability
After graduating, many full-time students obtain jobs in transport consultancy (or with other employers), whereas part-time students are often already working in transport planning for a consultancy or a local authority.
www.its.leeds.ac.uk/courses/employability

Doctoral
PhD research at ITS attracts students from around the world, and ITS supervised students can now be attached to a Doctoral Research Centre (DTC).  Research students are highly valued within ITS and despite often being at the early stages of their careers, are expected to make important contributions. Each student is encouraged to play an active role in the range of activities undertaken both within and across Research Groups.
www.its.leeds.ac.uk/courses/phd

Research 
(www.its.leeds.ac.uk/research)

ITS is one of the world's leading international centres for transport research. Research accounts for around two-thirds of all ITS activity and ranges from blue-skies exploration of new concepts through to applied research and work commissioned by specific clients.

ITS research is particularly notable for its breadth and depth, the international quality of which has been verified by the Research Excellence Framework (REF) stretching back over a period of 30+ years.  This is a function both of the size and nature of ITS; the inter- and multi-disciplinary approach brings together researchers of various backgrounds and means that ITS has the capability to research topics from a combination of differing perspectives.

ITS research is sponsored by a wide variety of organisations, including the UK Department for Transport, the European Commission, and the Engineering and Physical Sciences Research Council.

Research facilities
The University of Leeds Driving Simulator (UoLDS) is one of the most advanced worldwide in a research environment and allows research into driver behaviour to be performed in accurately controlled and repeatable laboratory conditions.  
UoLDS is a major research facility and was established in 2006 at a cost of over £1m. It provides the scope to undertake a wide variety of research, including much that would not be safe, ethical or cost effective to do on real roads. It is supported and operated by an expert team, who can tailor virtual scenarios and experimental data collection to the exact requirements of a particular investigation. Research projects include:

 Intelligent Speed Adaptation 
 Driver distraction by in-vehicle systems 
 Speed choice and road environment 
 Driver comprehension of traffic signs 
 Advanced Driver Assistance Systems 
 Vehicle design: active bonnet system 
 Driver behaviour in narrow lanes 
 Reduction of fatigue related accidents 
See the University of Leeds Driving Simulator website.

Staff 
(www.its.leeds.ac.uk/people)

The institute has around 100 staff members, consisting primarily of academic staff (teaching/research) and support staff. The precise number fluctuates, as ITS welcomes visiting academics on a regular basis, whom typically stay for periods of 1–12 months.

Academic staff are organised into 5 research groups:
 Economics and Appraisal 
 Spatial Modelling and Dynamics 
 Social and Political Sciences 
 Choice Modelling 
 Human Factors and Safety

The Director of the Institute for Transport Studies is Professor Simon Shepherd (as at 2020). As the 10th Director of ITS, Professor Shepherd succeeded Prof. Richard Batley, taking up the directorship in 2020 for a five-year term of office.  Previous postholders include Professors Greg Marsden, Mark Wardman, Oliver Carsten, Tony May, Peter Mackie, Chris Nash, Ken Gwilliam, Coleman O’Flaherty. www.its.leeds.ac.uk/people

Alumni 
(www.its.leeds.ac.uk/alumni)

The vast majority of ITS graduates go on to take up employment in the transport sector, commonly but not limited to, roles in academia, consultancy, government and operators.  Prominent UK-based alumni include:
   
 Michèle Dix - Managing Director, Crossrail 2. 
 John Nightingale - former president, Institute of Highway Engineers (IHE).
 Ben Still - Managing Director, West Yorkshire Combined Authority. 
 John Thomas - Regulatory Affairs Advisor, Etihad Rail. Formerly Director of Competition and Regulatory Economics, Office of Rail Regulation.
 Richard Turner OBE - former Chief Executive, Freight Transport Association.
 Kevin Austin, Director of Initiatives, C40 Cities. Formerly Head of Olympic Projects for London 2012, Greater London Authority.

Internationally:
 Bekele Geleta - former Secretary General, International Federation of Red Cross and Red Crescent Societies 
 Richard Humphreys – Transport Program, The World Bank 
 Fotis Karamitsos - Head of Maritime Transport & Intelligent Transport, The European Commission
 Jamie Leather - Transport Specialist, Asian Development Bank
 Man Ho Lee - Chief Transport Officer, Hong Kong Government

References

 Institute for Transport Studies website
 Partnership on Low Carbon Sustainable Transport
 European rail Research Network of Excellence, EURNEX

University of Leeds
Articles containing video clips
Transport research organizations
Transport organisations based in the United Kingdom